Kylen or Kylian is a variant of the name Kyle, and "means narrow or straight"

Notable people with the name include:

Kylen Granson, American football player
Kylen Mills, a sports reporter for KRON 4
Kylen Schulte (1983–2021), American female murder victim
Kylian Hazard (born 1995), Belgian professional footballer player
Kylian Mbappé (born 1998), French professional footballer player

See also
Gunnar Källén (1926–1968), Swedish Theoretical physicist and a professor at Lund University
Jiří Kylián (born 1947), Czech former dancer and contemporary dance choreographer
Kalen
Kellan
Kylene Barker (born 1955), American pageant winner
Kyle
Kyline Alcantara (born 2002), Filipino actor, singer, and model

References

Given names